Aleksey Yurievich Maetny (Russian: Алексей Юрьевич Маетный; born 31 May 1988) known as Markus Dupree is a Russian pornographic film actor and director.

Dupree has been nominated four times and won one time for AVN Award for Male Performer of the Year at the annual AVN Awards. Dupree was also a nominee for Foreign Male Performer of the Year at the 2016 and 2017 XBIZ Awards as well as Male Performer of the Year at the XRCO Awards.

Early life and education 
Aleksey Maetny (Russian: Алексей Юрьевич Маетный) was born May 31, 1988 in Leningrad, Russia SFSR, USSR (now Saint Petersburg, Russia). Dupree was raised alone by his mother. Dupree attended St. Petersburg Institute of International Trade, Economics and Law and graduated with a degree in economics and finance.

Career 
Dupree's adult film debut was 18 Year Old Pussy 14 with Devil's Film. Dupree was featured with fellow Russian adult performers Solne, Lara Page, Margo, Lana, Mary Rouge and Timo Hardy. In 2008 Dupree was featured in 8 films under the alias Markus. In 2009 Dupree continued working with Devil's Film starring in 17 films over the course of the year. Dupree in 2010 signed with Evil Angel and 21sextury Network. Beginning in February 2010 Dupree starred in Devil's Film University Gang Bang series. From 2010 to 2011 Dupree's work jumped dramatically to 105 films in 2011. Dupree shot with TeenCoreClub and Woodman Entertainment as well as his continued work with Devil's Film. In 2012 Dupree made his debut with Kink.com starring in 11 films. From 2012 to 2014 Dupree shot 634 films.

In 2014 Dupree began seeing industry award success. At the 31st AVN Awards Dupree was nominated for three awards; Best Sex Scene in a Foreign-Shot Production for Hose Monster 5, Best Sex Scene in a Foreign-Shot Production for his work in Cayenne Loves Rocco and Most Outrageous Sex Scene for XXX Factory.

In 2015 Dupree starred in Femmes de Footballeurs XXX a French film by Marc Dorcel. His work was nominated for an AVN Award for Best Sex Scene in a Foreign-Shot Production at the 32nd AVN Awards.

In 2017 at the 34th AVN Awards Dupree won Best Double Penetration Sex Scene for his work in Abella with Mick Blue and Abella Danger. Dupree was also nominated for AVN Award for Male Performer of the Year. Dupree also won Most Outrageous Sex Scene for his work in Holly Hendrix's Anal Experience. That same year he was nominated for Foreign Male Performer of the Year at the XBIZ Awards. In 2018 Dupree began directing films. In 2018 Dupree won AVN Male Performer Award.

It has been observed from the latest content available that Dupree underwent circumcision.Although the motives behind the procedure remain obscure, it is notable that it was carried out subsequent to his union with the esteemed adult film performer, Autumn Falls.

Filmography

Film

Television

Awards 
 2018AVN Award for Male Performer of the Year winner.

References

External links 
 
 

1988 births
Living people
Male actors from Saint Petersburg
Russian male pornographic film actors
Pornographic film directors
Russian expatriates in the United States